Made in America  may refer to:

 Made in USA, a country of origin label

Films
 Made in America (1993 film), a 1993 American comedy film starring Whoopi Goldberg and Ted Danson
 Made in America (2013 film), a 2013 American documentary film directed by Ron Howard

Literature
 Made in America (book), a non-fiction book by Bill Bryson
 Made in America: My Story, the autobiography of Wal-Mart's founder Sam Walton

Music
 Made in America (EP), an EP by Aerosmith, 2001
 Made in America (Kam album), 1995
 Made in America (The Blues Brothers album), 1980
 Made in America (The Carpenters album), 1981
 Made in America (Tower), a 2004 orchestral composition by Joan Tower
 Made in America, an EP by Cimorelli, 2013
 "Made in America" (Jay-Z and Kanye West song), 2011
 "Made in America" (Toby Keith song), 2011
 Made in America Festival, a music festival in Philadelphia founded by Jay-Z

Television
 Made in America (game show), a 1964 program produced by MGM Television
 "Made in America" (The Sopranos), the final episode of The Sopranos
 Made in America (TV program), a show on the Travel Channel hosted by John Ratzenberger
 Made in America, an Irish documentary series nominated for a 2006 Irish Film and Television Award

See also
 American Made (disambiguation)
 Crips and Bloods: Made in America, a documentary film directed by Stacy Peralta
 In America (film), a film directed by Jim Sheridan
 Made in USA (disambiguation)
 O.J.: Made in America, a 2016 American documentary produced and directed by Ezra Edelman
 Ornette: Made in America, a documentary about Ornette Coleman, directed by Shirley Clarke